John Holt (died 1504) of Chichester, Sussex, was an English educator to the future Henry VIII of England. He was a close friend of Thomas More and wrote a schoolboy textbook on Latin grammar. He was educated at Magdalen College, Oxford.

References

15th-century births
1504 deaths
Alumni of Magdalen College, Oxford
16th-century English educators
15th-century English educators
People from Chichester